is a city in Saitama Prefecture, Japan. , the city had an estimated population of 100,612 in 46,735 households and a population density of 2500 persons per km².

Geography
Sakado is located in the geographic center of Saitama Prefecture, about 40 kilometers from downtown Tokyo. The terrain is generally flat. The Koma River flows from the southwest to the northeast of the city.

Surrounding municipalities
Saitama Prefecture
Kawagoe
Tsurugashima
Higashimatsuyama
Hidaka
Moroyama
Kawajima
Hatoyama

Climate
Sakado has a humid subtropical climate (Köppen Cfa) characterized by warm summers and cool winters with light to no snowfall.  The average annual temperature in Sakado is 14.6 °C. The average annual rainfall is 1382 mm with September as the wettest month. The temperatures are highest on average in August, at around 26.5 °C, and lowest in January, at around 3.7 °C.

Demographics
Per Japanese census data, the population of Sakado has increased rapidly towards the end of the 20th century due to new town developments. It has since leveled off.

History
Sakado-juku was a post station on the Nikkō Wakiōkan highway connecting Hachiōji with Nikkō from the Muromachi period onwards. During the late Edo period and early Meiji period, the area was noted for sericulture. The village of Sakado was created within Iruma District, Saitama with the establishment of the modern municipalities system on April 1, 1889 and was elevated to city status on December 10, 1896. On July 1, 1954, Sakado annexed the neighboring villages of Miyoshino, Issai, Oya and Suguro. On September 1, 1976, Sakado was elevated to city status.

Government
Sakado has a mayor-council form of government with a directly elected mayor and a unicameral city council of 22 members. Sakado contributes one member to the Saitama Prefectural Assembly. In terms of national politics, the city is part of Saitama 10th district of the lower house of the Diet of Japan.

Economy
Sakado is a regional commercial center with some light and precision manufacturing and food processing, and is increasing a commuter town for Tokyo Metropolis.

Education

Universities
 Josai University
 Kagawa Nutrition University
 Meikai University School of Dentistry

High schools
 Sakado High School
 Sakado Nishi High School
 Senior High School at Sakado, University of Tsukuba
 Yamamura International High School

Elementary and junior high schools
Sakado has 11 public elementary schools and seven public middle schools operated by the city government, and two public high schools operated by the Saitama Prefectural Board of Education. There is also one national high school and one private high school. The prefecture also operates one special education school for the handicapped.

Transportation

Railway
 Tōbu Railway - Tōbu Tōjō Line
 -  –   
 Tōbu Railway - Tobu Ogose Line

Highway
  – Sakado Interchange
  – Sakado-Nishi Smart Interchange

Sister city relations
 Dothan, Alabama, USA (since March 1988)

City mascot
The city mascot  was created in 2006 to mark the 30th anniversary of Sakado gaining city status.

Local attractions

 Yosakoi festival held annually in Sakado in August since 2001.
Xien Ten Gong, the largest Taoist temple in Japan, is located in Sakado.

Notable people from Sakado
Takaki Horigome, musician, Kirinji
Yasuyuki Horigome, musician, Kirinji

References

External links

Official Website 

Cities in Saitama Prefecture
Sakado, Saitama